Manav Bhinder is an Indian filmmaker, screenwriter, actor and assistant director.

Work
Bhinder is best known for writing and directing short films like Dor (Special Festival Mention at Dada Saheb Phalke Film Festival 2014 and acting debut of Parineeti Chopra), Phir Ek Baar (Official Selection at Dada Saheb Phalke Film Festival 2014), Pursuit of Love (Winner – DNA Short Cuts, Short Film Festival 2015) and Ankahee Baatein, (Official Selection at Cannes Film Festival 2016 - Short Film Corner) starring Avika Gor, Barkha Bisht and Manish Raisinghan. His upcoming films include a short film titled "Ek Khoobsurat Ittefaq", starring Shashank Vyas and Adaa Khan, and produced by Priyanka Chopra. Apart from writing an directing short films, he has worked on a number of film projects as an Assistant Director and occasionally, as an actor.

Filmography

References

External links
 
 Official website

Film directors from Mumbai
Living people
Screenwriters from Mumbai
1990 births